Arpeni is a village in the Ashotsk Municipality of the Shirak Province of Armenia. Within the village is a 19th-century church. The Statistical Committee of Armenia reported its population was 397 in 2010, up from 373 at the 2001 census.

Demographics

References 

Communities in Shirak Province
Populated places in Shirak Province